Ellis Hollins (born 14 November 1999) is an English actor. He is known for portraying the role of Tom Cunningham in the Channel 4 soap opera Hollyoaks. In 2006, he appeared in Alpha Male, a family film released in the United Kingdom.

Acting work 
At age 3, Hollins was cast as Tom Cunningham in Channel 4's soap opera Hollyoaks.

In 2006, Hollins played the part of Nathan Lamis in the Dan Wilde production of Alpha Male. Hollins' part was dramatic and he undertook all his own stunts.

Hollins has been involved in many dramatic Hollyoaks storylines playing Tom, including the death of both his parents and his brother; starting a fire while playing with matches; going to court for attacking intruder Esther Bloom; getting kidnapped and a teenage pregnancy and adoption storyline when Tom got his on-screen girlfriend Peri Lomax pregnant.

Hollins has also appeared in several Hollyoaks spin offs. In November 2008, he appeared in all five episodes of series one of Hollyoaks Later, a late night spin-off series to Hollyoaks airing at 10pm on E4 over 5 consecutive nights. Hollins was involved in one of the main stories of the series, which saw Tom kidnapped by crazed Niall Rafferty. Hollins has appeared in all three series of the Hollyoaks Music show which aired on Saturday mornings on T4 over several months in 2009, 2010 and 2011. Hollins appeared as his Hollyoaks character, nicknamed 'Lil Tom' in a segment which saw Tom Cunningham interview various music artists. He also appeared in the October 2009 spin-off series Hollyoaks: The Good, the Bad and the Gorgeous, which took a look back at some of the best moments in Hollyoaks. The special also featured various specially filmed segments and Hollins appeared in one as Tom. Hollins started alongside Carley Stenson (Steph Cunningham).

In 2012, Hollins played the role of a young Hans Christian Andersen in the BBC Radio 4 Drama The Beautiful Ugly.

Awards
Hollins has become popular amongst Hollyoaks fans and was nominated for a British Soap Award in the 'Best Dramatic Performance from a Young Actor or Actress' category in 2005, 2006, 2007, 2008, 2009 and 2011. He won the award in 2006. Hollins won Best Young Actor at the Inside Soap Awards in 2006 and 2008 and was nominated for the award in 2007, 2009, 2010 and 2011.  In 2008, he won Best Child Actor at the inaugural Digital Spy Soap Awards. In 2009 in a poll for Inside Soap magazine, Hollins' Hollyoaks character, Tom, was voted 'Soap's Greatest Ever Youngster'. Hollins was also nominated for Best Young Actor at the 2012 Inside Soap Magazine awards.

References

External links 
 

1999 births
Living people
Male actors from Manchester
English male child actors
English male soap opera actors
English male radio actors
21st-century English male actors